Chicken Zombies is an album by Thee Michelle Gun Elephant, released in 1997.

The album made it to #4 on the Japanese albums chart.

Album cover 

The CD album cover is similar to the cover of Vincebus Eruptum by Blue Cheer. The cover of the vinyl release is a parody of The Who's Odds & Sods album. Rather than the band's helmets reading "R O C K," they spelled out "F U C K"; this did not stop the album cover from being advertised on billboards in Japan.

Track listing 

"Russian Huskey" - 2:24
"Hi! China!" - 2:56
"Mongoose" - 3:21
"Get Up Lucy (album version)" - 4:35
"The Birdmen" - 3:47
"Boogie" - 8:17
"I've never been you. (Jesus Time)" - 0:06
"Cow 5" - 2:00
"Culture (album version)" - 3:09
"Sunny Side River" - 4:27
"Bronze Master" - 3:22
"Romantic (broiler dinner version)" - 6:33
"I've never been you. (King Time)" - 0:20

See also
Poultrygeist: Night of the Chicken Dead, working title Poultrygeist: Attack of the Chicken Zombies, a 2006 film

References

Thee Michelle Gun Elephant albums
1997 albums